is a Japanese footballer currently playing as a goalkeeper for Sanfrecce Hiroshima and the Japan national team.

International career
On May 24, 2019, Osako was called up by Japan's head coach Hajime Moriyasu to feature in the Copa América played in Brazil. He made his debut on 17 June 2019 in the opening game of Copa against Chile, as a starter.

Career statistics

Club
.

Notes

Honours

Club
Sanfrecce Hiroshima
 J.League Cup: 2022

National team statistics

References

External links

1999 births
Living people
Japanese footballers
Association football goalkeepers
J1 League players
Sanfrecce Hiroshima players
Japan youth international footballers
Japan under-20 international footballers
Japan international footballers
2019 Copa América players
Association football people from Kagoshima Prefecture
Footballers at the 2020 Summer Olympics
Olympic footballers of Japan